Pimea is a genus of land planarians that currently contains a single species, Pimea monticola, from the central highlands of New Caledonia.

Description 
Pimea monticola is characterized by an expanded anterior end with a musculo-glandular organ in the form of an adhesive pad. The cutaneous longitudinal musculature is partially insunk into the mesenchyma and originates a retractor muscle associated to the musculo-glandular organ. The mesenchymal musculature is weak. The copulatory apparatus lacks adenodactyls and has an intra-antral penis papilla.

Etymology 
The genus name Pimea comes from a pre-colonial Melanesian clan, the Pime, that lived in an area close to the type-locality. The specific epithet monticola comes from Latin mons, a mountain + -cola, dweller, inhabitant, thus meaning "mountain dweller".

References 

Geoplanidae
Rhabditophora genera